Mason–Tillett House, also known as Rock Hill, Mason's, Long's Farm, and Brunswick Plantation, is a historic plantation house at Valentines, Brunswick County, Virginia. Built about 1780, it is a T-shaped, two-story frame structure with a -story addition added about 1832. The front facade features a two-story pedimented porch. The interior features exceptional surviving grained and marbleized woodwork. 
It was listed on the National Register of Historic Places in 2004.

References

Plantation houses in Virginia
Houses on the National Register of Historic Places in Virginia
Houses completed in 1780
Houses in Brunswick County, Virginia
National Register of Historic Places in Brunswick County, Virginia